Hambakseom or Hambakdo is an island in Yonan County, South Hwanghae, North Korea.

Background 
The 1953 Armistice Agreement, which was signed by both North Korea and the United Nations Command (UNC), ended the Korean War and specified that all islands in former Hwanghae Province except the five islands including Yeonpyeong Island and Baengnyeong Island would remain under the control of the UNC and South Korea.

The five islands were Yeonpyeong Island, Baengnyeongdo, Daecheongdo, Socheongdo and U Island. However, U Island was actually part of Ganghwa County since 1918. Also, South Korea is not a signatory of the 1953 Armistice Agreement.

In 1965, there was a clash in this island South Korean fishermen caught clams on the island. North Korea detained and eventually returned the fishermen. South Korea claimed that Hambakseom is a part of Ganghwa County.

South Korea registered Hambakseom to Tract index in 1978. Hambakseom was uninhabited until 2017. In 2019, South Korean newspaper noticed that there are North Korean military buildings in Hambakseom. It caused huge debates in South Korea.

On September 5, 2019, Chosun Ilbo reported that the island has a radar with range of 30 to 60 kilometers.

South Korean government on September 18, 2019, confirmed that no offensive weapons are on the island.

Board of Audit and Inspection confirmed claims made by South Korean government that Hambakdo is north of northern limit line and is a North Korean island.

References

Links

 Video of Hambakdo Island

Disputed islands
Territorial disputes of North Korea
Territorial disputes of South Korea
North Korea–South Korea border
North Korea–South Korea relations
Ganghwa County
Islands of Incheon
Islands of the Yellow Sea
South Hwanghae